Ponte de Cavalos is a bridge in Portugal. It is located in Vale de Cambra, Aveiro District.

See also
List of bridges in Portugal

Bridges in Aveiro District
Vale de Cambra